The E120 bomblet was a biological cluster bomb sub-munition developed to disseminate a liquid biological agent. The E120 was developed by the United States in the early 1960s.

History
The E120 bomblet was one of several biological weapons that were developed before the United States abandoned its offensive biological warfare program in 1969–1970. The E120 was developed in the early 1960s. The Schu S-4 strain of the tularemia bacterium was standardized as Agent UL for use in the E120 bomblet.

Specifications
The E120 was a spherical bomblet with a diameter of 11.4 centimeters. It was designed to hold 0.1 kilograms of liquid biological agent. Much like the M139 bomblet, the E120 had exterior "vanes". However, the vanes' function on the E120 was to cause the bomblet to rotate as it fell, thus shattering and rolling around upon impact while spraying the agent from a nozzle.

See also
E14 munition
E61 anthrax bomblet
Flettner rotor bomblet
M143 bomblet

References

Biological weapon delivery systems
Submunitions